A securities turnover excise tax (STET) is a small tax on every stock, swap, derivative, or other trade. It has been levied historically in the United States and has been proposed more recently as a way to reduce speculation in financial markets.

History
In the United States, the STET was used to  fund the Spanish–American War.

Re-instatement of the STET was briefly proposed in 1990 as a part of US deficit reduction measures.

Advocacy
John Maynard Keynes, in The General Theory of Employment, Interest, and Money suggested that an excise tax on transactions and trades would discourage speculation in the stock market.

In 1934, muckraking journalist and novelist Upton Sinclair ran for Governor of California on the End Poverty in California plan. The fourth plank of the plan called for repeal of the state's sales tax and imposition of "a tax on stock transfers at the rate of 4 cents per share."

The STET was a major plank of the 2008 platform of American presidential candidate Ralph Nader, and that same year was proposed by Oregon Congressman Peter DeFazio as a means to pay for the Emergency Economic Stabilization Act of 2008.

See also
 Financial transaction tax
 Robin Hood tax
 Stamp duty
 Tobin tax

References

Excises